Steve Hemmingsen served as co-anchor of "Keloland News" at television station, KELO-TV, in Sioux Falls, South Dakota.  He most recently served as co-anchor with Angela Kennecke.  In May 2000, he entered semi-retirement.

Hemmingsen currently writes the "Weighing In" column at the Keloland.com website.

External links
Steve Hemmingsen's biography at www.keloland.com
"Weighing In" column by Steve Hemmingsen

South Dakota television reporters
South Dakota television anchors
Living people
Year of birth missing (living people)
People from Sioux Falls, South Dakota
Journalists from South Dakota